This is a list of Malta national football team results from 1957 to 1979.

1950s

1957

1958

1959

1960s

1960

1961

1962

1964

1966

1969

1970s

1970

1971

1972

1973

1974

1975

1976

1977

1978

1979

Notes

Further reading

External links 
 Malta national team all time international results

1950s in Malta
1960s in Malta
1970s in Malta
Malta national football team results